"When a Woman Loves" is the first single by American singer R. Kelly from his eleventh studio album Love Letter. The song peaked at number 93 on the Billboard Hot 100; and it was promoted with a music video directed by Kelly and Jeremy Rall. In 2011 R. Kelly was nominated for a Grammy Award for Best Traditional R&B Performance, but lost.

Music video
The music video is directed by Jeremy Rall, who also directed Kelly’s later music video "Radio Message".

Critical reception
Entertainment Weekly commented that the song "has a classic throwback vibe unlike almost anything in his recent catalog."

Charts

References

2009 songs
2010 singles
Jive Records singles
Music videos directed by R. Kelly
Music videos directed by Jeremy Rall
R. Kelly songs
Song recordings produced by R. Kelly
Songs written by R. Kelly